Shakira Baker (born 4 January 1992) is a New Zealand rugby union player. She has represented New Zealand in both the fifteens and sevens rugby.

Rugby career

2011 
Baker made her provincial debut at 16 for Wellington before making her test debut for the Black Ferns in 2011 against England.

2012 
Baker was one of the 800 young women who attended the “Gold for Gold” Sevens trials in 2012 organized to identify talent with the potential to represent New Zealand in the Sevens competition at the Rio Olympics. At the trial she attended she was put through various fitness, rugby skills and character assessment activities. She was one of the most promising 30 who then attended a camp at Waiouru. This led to Baker playing both for the Sevens team as well as the Fifteen a side Black Ferns.

2013 
In 2013 during a routine medical exam an electrocardiogram led to the discovery that she had a rare disorder of the heart's electrical system called Long QT syndrome which can lead to dangerous heart rhythms, fainting and sudden cardiac arrest. In her case it can be triggered by physical activity. She was treated first with a sympathectomy, where the nerve that controls the heart rate was burned in order to prevent it going over a certain rate, before key-hole surgery was used to cut the nerve supply to her heart. As a result, she missed most of the 2013 rugby season. Despite the success of the treatment it is necessary to have a defibrillator close by whenever she plays. Her first game back for the Sevens was at Dubai at the end of 2013.

2014–23 
Baker then incurred a knee injury early in 2014 from which she recovered in time to be named in the Black Ferns squad to the 2014 Women's Rugby World Cup.

Baker was selected for the New Zealand women's sevens team to the 2016 Summer Olympics. In 2022, she was named as a non-travelling reserve for the Black Ferns Sevens squad to the Commonwealth Games in Birmingham.

In December 2022, She was confirmed as one of three final signings for Hurricanes Poua for the 2023 Super Rugby Aupiki season.

Personal life
She is related to New Zealand Sevens star Gilles Kaka. Of Māori descent, Baker affiliates to the Ngāti Kahungunu iwi.

References

External links
 
 
 
 
 Black Ferns Profile

1992 births
Living people
New Zealand female rugby union players
New Zealand women's international rugby union players
Rugby sevens players at the 2016 Summer Olympics
Olympic rugby sevens players of New Zealand
New Zealand female rugby sevens players
New Zealand women's international rugby sevens players
Ngāti Kahungunu people
Rugby union players from Masterton
New Zealand Māori rugby union players
Rugby union wings
Rugby union fullbacks
Wellington rugby union players
Olympic silver medalists for New Zealand
Olympic medalists in rugby sevens
Medalists at the 2016 Summer Olympics
Rugby sevens players at the 2018 Commonwealth Games
Commonwealth Games rugby sevens players of New Zealand
Commonwealth Games gold medallists for New Zealand
Commonwealth Games medallists in rugby sevens
Medallists at the 2018 Commonwealth Games